Carol Lynch Williams is an author of Young Adult and Middle Grade novels. As of 2016, Williams is the conference director for Writing and Illustrating for Young Readers (WIFYR) conference and is a professor of creative writing at Brigham Young University (BYU). She graduated in 2008 from Vermont College of Fine Arts with a degree in Writing for Children and Young Adults.

Personal 
Williams has six daughters and a son. Williams grew up in Florida but currently lives in Utah.

Overall themes and response 
Williams read as part of the English Department reading series in the fall of 2008. John Bennion noted about that her characters "return love for cruelty." Williams' characters have to deal with abuse, aging, death, suicide, and other difficult challenges, yet rise above all of these difficulties. Bennion remarked, "we identify with her young women adults because they come out independent, relying on themselves." Williams' work has also been praised as "Intensely gripping and grippingly intense", "absorbing", "outstanding", and "stunning, gut-punching, heart-wrenching, heart-healing."

Awards 
 Winner, AML Award 2001 Middle Grade Novel My Angelica
 Winner, Whitney Award Best Youth Fiction The Chosen One
A complete list of Williams' awards can be found on her blog.

Published works

Middle Grade 
 Kelly and Me
 The True Colors of Caitlynne Jackson
 Adeline Street
 Pretty Like Us
 I forget, you remember
 A Mother to Embarrass Me
 Just in Time series

Young Adult 
 Never Said
 The Haven
 Signed, Skye Harper
 The Chosen One
 Miles from Ordinary
 Waiting
 Glimpse
 My Angelica
 Carolina Autumn

Non-Fiction 
 Sister, Sister: A Book of Activities Sisters Can Do Together

Latter-Day Daughters 
 Victoria's Courage
 Sarah's Quest
 Marciea's Melody
 Laurel's flight
 Esther's Celebration
 Caroline's Secret
 Catherine's Remembrance
 Anna's gift

Other Latter-Day Saint Fiction 
 Walk to Hope
 Laura's Box of Treasures

References

External links

 Website

20th-century American novelists
21st-century American novelists
21st-century American women writers
American women novelists
American young adult novelists
Brigham Young University faculty
Living people
Novelists from Florida
Novelists from Utah
Vermont College of Fine Arts alumni
1959 births